Karl-Heinz Kipp (12 February 1924 – 11 October 2017) was a German billionaire, and founder of the  department store chain. He sold the business but kept the property, and had a large property portfolio. In 2017, Forbes estimated his net wealth at US$4.9 billion.

Career
Kipp began his career in 1948 selling clothes and opened his first Massa department store in 1965. At the beginning of the 1970s Kipp built the first large-scale consumer market on a "greenfieldsite". In 1981 Kipp introduced financial shopping  throughout the country. In 1986 the Massa supermarkets went public; the following year he sold his last shares in the operationalbusiness of the Massa supermarkets, which were later merged into Metro.The Massa stores were introduced on the German stock market in 1986. In 1987 Kipp sold his remaining shares but he kept the real estate of the stores, which he rented to the retailer Metro AG.

Real estate 
Kipp owned real estate in the U.S., including 950 Third Avenue in Manhattan.

In 1980 Kipp acquired the five-star Tschuggen Grand Hotel in Arosa. In addition, he owned five Swiss hotels and resorts in his "Tschuggen Hotel Group", including the Hotel Eden Roc in Ascona, the Carlton Hotel in St Moritz and the Tschuggen Grand Hotel in Arosa.

Personal life
Kipp and his wife, Hannelore resided in Arosa, Switzerland.

His son, former Florida resident Ernst-Ludwig Kipp, died in 2003, leaving behind his seven children. His daughter Ursula married Dr Wilfried Bechtolsheimer and together they have three sons, Felix (a singer with the rock group Hey Negrita), Goetz, and Till (the founder of Arosa Capital Management and amateur racing driver who competes in the 2021 IMSA SportsCar Championship), and a daughter, Laura, an Olympic dressage rider.

References

1924 births
2017 deaths
German businesspeople in retailing
German company founders
20th-century German businesspeople
21st-century German businesspeople
German billionaires
People from Alzey
German expatriates in Switzerland